This is a list of census-designated places in Hawaii. There are no separately incorporated cities in the entire state; Honolulu is both a city and county. There are 151 census-designated places. Population data from the 2020 Census.

Cities, towns and villages of Hawaii

See also
List of counties in Hawaii
Landforms of Hawaii (bays, mountains, etc.)

Notes

References
USGS Fips55 database

Places
Hawaii
Hawaii
Hawaii